The Ministry of Economy was a department of the Albanian government responsible for the Economy, Tourism and Enterprise in Albania.

The ministry was abolished on 13 September 2017 and merged with the Ministry of Finances.

History
Since the establishment of the institution, the Ministry of Economy has been reorganized by joining other departments or merging with other ministries, thus making its name change several times. This list reflects the changes made in years in pluralist history since 1992 as an institution:

 Ministry of Economy, Trade and Energy (Ministria e Ekonomisë, Tregtisë dhe Energjetikës ) from 2005 to 2013
 Ministry of Economic Development, Tourism, Trade and Enterprise (Ministria e Zhvillimit Ekonomik, Turizmit, Tregtisë dhe Sipërmarrjes) from 2013 to 2017

Officeholders (1929–present)

Notes

See also
 Economy of Albania

References

Economy
Politics of Albania
1912 establishments in Albania